George V the Brilliant (Giorgi V Brtskinvale; also translated as the Illustrious, or Magnificent; 1286/1289–1346) was King of Georgia from 1299 to 1302 and again from 1314 until his death in 1346. A flexible and far-sighted politician, he recovered Georgia from a century-long Mongol domination, restoring the country's previous strength and Christian culture.

Reign

George was born to King Demetrius II the Self-sacrificing and his third wife Natela, daughter of Beka I Jaqeli, prince and Atabeg of Samtskhe. Demetrius was executed by the Mongols in 1289, and the little prince George was carried to Samtskhe to be reared at the court of his maternal grandfather (Beka).

In 1299, the Ilkhanid khan Ghazan installed him as a rival ruler to George's elder brother, the rebellious Georgian King David VIII. However, George's authority did not extend beyond the Mongol-protected capital Tbilisi, so George was referred to during this period as "The Shadow King of Tbilisi". In 1302, he was replaced by his brother, Vakhtang III. After the death of both his elder brothers – David and Vakhtang – George became a regent for David's son, George VI, who died underage in 1313, allowing George V to be crowned king for a second time. Having initially pledged his loyalty to the Il-khan Öljaitü, he began a program of reuniting the Georgian lands. In 1315, he led the Georgian auxiliaries to suppress an anti-Mongol revolt in Asia Minor, an expedition that would prove to be the last in which the Georgians fought in the Mongol ranks. In 1320, he drove the marauding Alans out of the town Gori and forced them back to the Caucasus Mountains.

King George was on friendly terms with the influential Mongol prince Choban, who was executed by Abu Sa'id Khan in 1327. George used this loss as a pretext to rebel against the already weakened Ilkhanate. He stopped payments of tribute and drove the Mongols out of the country. The following year he ordered great festivities on the Mount Tsivi to celebrate the anniversary of the victory over the Mongols, and massacred there all oppositionist nobles. In 1329, George laid siege to Kutaisi, western Georgia, reducing the local king Bagrat I the Little to a vassal prince.  In 1334 he reasserted royal authority over the virtually independent principality of Samtskhe, ruled by his cousin Qvarqvare I Jaqeli. Having restored the kingdom's unity, he focused now on cultural, social and economic projects. He changed the coins issued by Ghazan khan with the Georgian ones, called George's tetri. Between 1325 and 1338, he worked out two major law codes, one regulating the relations at the royal court and the other devised for the peace of a remote and disorderly mountainous district. Under him, Georgia established close international commercial ties, mainly with the Byzantine Empire, but also with the great European maritime republics, Genoa and Venice.

George V also extended diplomatic relations to the Bahri dynasty of Egypt, achieving the restoration of several Georgian monasteries in Palestine to the Georgian Orthodox Church and gaining free passage for Georgian pilgrims to the Holy Land. 
According to Kldiashvili (1997), the introduction of the Jerusalem cross, taken as the inspiration for the modern national flag of Georgia in the 1990s, might date to the reign of George V.

In the 1330s, George secured the southwestern province of Klarjeti against the advancing Osmanli tribesmen led by Orhan I. In 1341 he interfered in the power struggle in the neighbouring Empire of Trebizond and supported Anna Anachoutlou who ascended the throne with the help of the Laz, only to be put to death a year later.

George V died in 1346.  He was succeeded by his only son, David IX. He was buried at the Gelati Monastery near Kutaisi, western Georgia.

Marriage and child
The identity of his wife is not known. The "Georgian Chronicle" of the 18th century reports George V marrying a daughter of "the Greek Emperor, Lord Michael Komnenos". However the reigning dynasty of the Byzantine Empire in the 14th century were the Palaiologoi, not the Komnenoi. The marriage of a daughter of Michael IX Palaiologos and his wife Rita of Armenia to a Georgian ruler is not recorded in Byzantine sources. Neither is the existence of any illegitimate daughters of Michael IX. The Komnenoi did rule however in the Empire of Trebizond. A Michael Komnenos was Emperor from 1344 to 1349, but his only attested child was John III of Trebizond; whether John III had siblings is unknown.

The Chronicle reports only one known son of George V, David IX of Georgia.

References

 George V the Brilliant (In Georgian)
 Ronald Grigor Suny, The Making of the Georgian Nation: 2nd edition (December 1994), Indiana University Press, page 44
 

Kings of Georgia
Bagrationi dynasty of the Kingdom of Georgia
Monarchs deposed as children
Medieval child monarchs
1280s births
1346 deaths
Year of birth uncertain
Eastern Orthodox monarchs
Regents of Georgia
14th-century monarchs in Europe
14th-century viceregal rulers
13th-century people from Georgia (country)
14th-century people from Georgia (country)